The 1990 UCI Road World Championships took place in Utsunomiya, Japan, from September 1 to September 2, 1990.

Events summary

References

External links
Les-sports.info

 
UCI Road World Championships by year
World Championships
Uci Road World Championships
UCI Road World Championships
International cycle races hosted by Japan